The Symphony No. 13 in B-flat minor, Op. 36 by Nikolai Myaskovsky was composed in 1933.

It is in one movement in three sections:

Andante moderato
Agitato molto e tenebroso
Andante nostalgico

Its premiere was conducted by Leo Ginzburg.  It received possibly its first performance in recent times on November 9, 1994 in a BBC Radio 3 broadcast from the BBC National Orchestra of Wales conducted by Tadaaki Otaka.
Its central section contains a fugato in B minor, and "peters out" with quiet B minor dissonant chords.

It is among Myaskovsky's more dissonant compositions.

The symphony lasts about 20 minutes in performance.  It was apparently not published until 1945.

Recordings
Evgeny Svetlanov, Russian Academic Federation Symphony Orchestra (Russian Disc, Melodiya, Olympia OCD 733, Warner) (recorded between 1991 and 1993)

References

External links
 (PD-CA only - public domain in the USA around 2040 or so, in the EU around 2026.)

13
1933 compositions
Compositions in B-flat minor